Robert James Vodden Clark (12 April 1907 – 25 September 1998) was Dean of Edinburgh from 1967 to 1976.

He was educated at  Edinburgh Theological College and ordained in 1941. He was Curate at St Paul & St George, Edinburgh from 1941 to 1944   He held  incumbencies in Fort William,  Edinburgh and Falkirk before his time as Dean.

Notes

1907 births
1998 deaths
Alumni of Edinburgh Theological College
Scottish Episcopalian clergy
Deans of Edinburgh